The 2013 Women's European Roller Hockey U-17 Championship was the 1st edition (non-official) of the European Women's Roller Hockey Juvenile Championship organized by the German roller hockey club SC Moskitos Wuppertal, after the cancellation of the official edition by CERH due to lack of participating teams.
In this competition the national teams of Switzerland, France and two teams of Germany (1 with 5 players, mainly from SC Moskitos, and the other team with 6 players) participated.

Round-robin Stage

Championship knock-out

Final Classification

References

External links
World's rink-hockey biggest website
Comité Européen de Rink-Hockey CERH website

European Women's U-17 Roller Hockey Championship
European Championship
2013 in German women's sport
International roller hockey competitions hosted by Germany